Please Come Home... Mr. Bulbous is the eighth studio album by American heavy metal/hard rock trio King's X. It was released in 2000 via Metal Blade Records.

Track listing
All songs written by King's X.

Personnel

Doug Pinnick – bass, vocals
Ty Tabor – guitar, vocals
Jerry Gaskill – drums, vocals

Album notes

 Recorded and mixed by Ty Tabor
 Doug uses  Yamaha Basses, DR Strings, Ampeg Amps and Seymour Duncan Pickups
 Jerry uses Yamaha Drums, Vater Sticks and Paiste Cymbals
 Ty uses Yamaha Guitars and DR Strings
 Misc. ramblings by Esther, Yuko, Joe and Dirk - between some tracks on the CD there are tongue twisters in Dutch and Japanese.  These were collected by the band on a European tour:
 at the end of track 1: Acht-en-Tachtig-Prachtige-GrachtenThis is Dutch for "88 (achtentachtig) beautiful (prachtige) canals (grachten)."
 at the end of track 3: Tonari no kyaku wa yoku kaki kuu kyaku daThis is a Japanese tongue twister (hayakuchi kotoba) meaning "The adjacent (tonari) customer (kyaku) eats (kuu) persimmons (kaki) often (yoku)."
 at the end of track 4: Zes-en-Zestig-Sinaas-Appel-SchillenThis is again Dutch and means "66 (zesenzestig) orange (sinaasappel) peels (schillen)."
 at the end of track 5: Hottentotten-Tenten-TentoonstellingenDutch tongue twister meaning "(an) exhibition of tents made by the Hottentots."
 at the end of track 6: Chikushō, nante hidee sandoicchi daJapanese meaning "Damn (chikushō)! How awful (hidee) this sandwich (sandoicchi) is!"
 at the end of track 10: Acht-en-Tachtig-Prachtige-GrachtenSee first tongue twister.

References

External links
Official band website
Additional information about the album

2000 albums
King's X albums
Metal Blade Records albums